The Brigadier General Charles E. McGee Library, formerly the Silver Spring Library, is part of the Montgomery County Public Libraries System. It opened to the public in 1931 and is currently located at 900 Wayne Avenue in Silver Spring, Maryland.
The library is named for Charles E. McGee, a Tuskegee Airman who had lived in Montgomery County.

History

Early locations 
Silver Spring Library began service in 1931 at East Silver Spring Elementary School.

In 1934, the library moved to Jesup Blair Community House, also known as "The Moorings." Architect Howard Wright Cutler remodeled the building to serve as a library, and his work earned the building a nomination for placement on the National Register of Historic Places in 1975. The library operated out of the Jesup Blair House for 23 years.

Colesville Road location 
The library opened a building of its own at 8901 Colesville Road in 1957, on land donated by the Hecht Company. At this location, the library occupied a building dedicated exclusively for the library's use for the first time.

Ellsworth Urban Park was created in an area covering  beside the library in 1979. The park has two playground areas where parents can take their children to play, and a tennis court.

In 1990, Marcia Billig's sculpture Lion and the Mouse was installed in the grass of the library.

A celebration of 58 years of service was held on March 15, 2015, the last day of service at the Colesville Road location.

Current library 

The current library location at 900 Wayne Avenue in Silver Spring was inaugurated on June 20, 2015. A $23 million contract was originally planned for construction of the new library, but the project was reduced by $3 million to provide funds to renovate the Fillmore, a music venue nearby in downtown Silver Spring. The completed structure stands seven stories tall. It has a coffee shop and a platform for the future Purple Line light rail station. In 2022, the library was renamed for Brigadier General Charles E. McGee, a Tuskegee Airman who had lived in Montgomery County.

 1st and 2nd floors: Drop-off window,  Kefa Cafe, county offices, meeting rooms and artists studios.
 3rd floor: Customer service, movies, teen books, conference room, meeting rooms, Mac lab (teens), study rooms, pick-up area, drop off area.
 4th floor: Books, audiobooks, CDs, newspapers and magazines room, conference and study rooms, computer rooms.
 5th floor: Children's floor.

Collection 

The library has a collection of 90,000 books, magazines, downloadable music, e-books, and a World Language Collection in Amharic, Chinese, French, Spanish, and Vietnamese, organized in the following way:

Teens collection (third floor) 

 Pick up holds section
 DVD 7 days express
 DVD TV series
 Express DVD section
 New fiction for children
 Books for teens: Fiction, non fiction, graphic novels, manga.

Adults collection (fourth floor) 

 Reading books (with magazines and newspapers)
 Audiobooks section
 Shelves organized by Dewey Decimal classification (000 to 999) 
 World languages.
 Biographies organized by subjects last name.
 Fiction, new books large type fiction (by author's last name).
 Non fiction (by author's last name).
 Graphic novels 
 Mystery & new mystery
 Romance
 Librarians choice

Children collection (fifth floor) 

 Picture books
 New picture books
 Beginning readers
 DVDs & Vox books (printed and audio books)
 Braille books
 Series books
 Audio books
 Fiction books for 2nd to 7th grade.
 Children internet computers
 Biographies & reference
 Library center
 World languages
 Children internet computers.

Other resources 

Other resources available at Brigadier General Charles E. McGee Library are the following:

 47 all-in-one computers with Core i5 processor at 3 GHz, 8 GB RAM, webcam, 1080p/23" screen, an Intel HD Graphics 4600, USB ports, DVD-RW drives, 256 GB Solid-state drive and 30 Mbit/s download/105 Mbit/s upload Internet access each one.
 Six iMac computers,
 Two 3D printers,
 A business center with a  scanner, and copier/printer.

Services 

 Library cards: Free for Montgomery County and D.C. area residents and students and are valid for 1 year. Money can be added to library cards to be used for printing of documents.
 Each user can borrow up 100 books and magazines for 3 weeks, that can be renewed up to 3 times.
 Each user can borrow up to 20 movies every week and most of them can be renewed up to 3 times.
 Each user can borrow audiobooks and ebooks for up to 3 weeks.
 Each user can borrow e-books from 3M dispenser machines with 3M book readers and on-line using Overdrive and 3M applications for PC, Kindle tablets, Nook tablets, and so forth. e-books can also be downloaded to a computer, and using Adobe Digital Editions software, these books can be uploaded to classic versions of Kindle and Nook.
 Hold lockers where users can pick up 24/7 books that were reserved.
 Drop off area available 24/7, where users can return books that were borrowed with. The use of RFID technology allow to return books to the system automatically.
 Automated borrowing: Spots with RFID scanners were users can borrow books by themselves.
 Mango Languages: Online language learning website for Montgomery County Public Libraries users.
 Muzzy Online: An interactive language learning website for children with animations and games, free for Montgomery County Public Libraries users.
 LibX toolbar: Allow to search from Montgomery County Public Libraries catalog from a toolbar on your web browser. Available for Firefox and Chrome.

Study rooms 

The library has 14 study rooms with space for up to 8 people. Study rooms can be reserved online every week, and can be used once a day for up to 2 hours every day.

Printers and scanners 
The library has four multi-function printers that can be used with a library card. Scanning of documents is free and can be stored via USB flash drives. Documents can be printed from any computer in the library and have a cost of 15 cents per black-and-white page and $1 per color page.

Hotspot 

The library also has a free hotspot with up to 10 MiB/s of throughput for visitors with personal laptops, tablets or smartphones.

Online services and mobile applications 

Montgomery County Public Libraries works with more than ten providers of online services and companies that offer desktop access but also developed their own applications for mobile devices such as tablets, cellphones (such as Android and iPhone), and Kindle that use its services.

Among the apps are the following:

 BookMine: An application to search on Montgomery County Public Library catalog that also can be used to manage Montgomery County Public Library card accounts. Available for iOS and Android.
 3M Cloud Library: Application to download e-books on EPUB format. Available for iOS, Android and Android for Kindle.
 OverDrive Media Console: Application to download e-books using Montgomery County Public Library accounts. Available for iOS, Android, Android for Kindle, Blackberry. and Windows phone.
 Freegal Music: Application to download 5 free songs every week. Available for iOS, Android and Android for Kindle (via SlideMe).
 Zinio: Free collection of more than 5,000 full color digital magazines. Available for iOS, Android and Android for Kindle.
 Flipster: Application to read free digital magazine provided from your library.
 OnceClickDigital: Application where can be downloaded audiobooks and e-books with MCPL library cards. Available for iOS, Android, Android for kindle.
 Mango Languages: An online language learning resource free for library users where can be learn more than 70 languages. Available for iOS, Android and Android for Kindle.
 Reference USA for iPad: Search tool for business and residential information, used also for job searching.
 Access My Library: Tool that helps to look for libraries by market and distance, and also allow to search items on library catalogs, read biographies, articles, journals, etc. Available for iOS and Android.
 EBSCOhost: Tool that helps to search on libraries databases organizing them by date or relevance. Available for iOS and Android.
 LibriVox: Application where anyone can download audiobooks. Available for Android and iOS.
 Kanopy: It is an on-demand streaming video platform for public libraries and universities that offers films and documentaries. All the users have access to the Kanopy kids subdivision.

Courtesy charging stations 

Three courtesy charging stations are available, with connectors, where visitors can charge cellphones and tablets.

Accessibility 

The library follows Accessibility regulations:

 Wheelchair ramps at both entrances.
 Four ADA computers that follow the Americans with Disabilities Act for persons with visual impairment or physical disabilities.
 Two wide elevators:
Fenton St. elevator (located beside Kefa Cafe) has access from 1st floor to 3rd, 4th and 5th floors and from 4th and 5th floor to 3rd floor
Wayne Ave. elevator from 1st to 3rd (main) floor and from 3rd floor to 1st floor.
 7 restrooms, each with baby changing stations.
 Air conditioning to cool the library in summer, heat pumps to warm it in winter, and ventilation on every floor.

See also 

 Montgomery County, Maryland

References 

1931 establishments in Maryland
Buildings and structures in Silver Spring, Maryland
Downtown Silver Spring, Maryland
Education in Montgomery County, Maryland
Library buildings completed in 2015
Libraries established in 1931
Public libraries in Maryland